The South Pacific Film Corporation (SPFC) was a Dutch government sponsored feature film producer in the Dutch West Indies. A separate unit produced newsreels in Indonesia. The production company was sponsored under the Netherlands Indies Civil Administration. It was preceded by the Netherlands Indies Government Information Service.

Andjar Asmara worked for SPFC beginning in 1948.  He brought Usmar Ismail, a young journalist with whom he had previously discussed filmmaking, to work as an assistant director. The two Native Indonesians had limited creative input, serving more as acting and dialogue coaches, while Dutch cameraman, A. A. Denninghoff-Stelling, had control of the final product.

SPFC produced six films in 1949.

Max Tera worked for South Pacific Film Corporation and learned cinematography from Dutch cameraman Denninghoff-Stelling.

Rendra Karno (Soekarno) had a role in the company's production Anggrek Bulan. A. Hamid Arief acted in films for the South Pacific Film Corporation, including Usmar Ismail's debut film Tjitra.

Films
Djaoeh Dimata (Out of Sight) 1948
Anggrek Bulan (Moon Orchid) 1948
Gadis Desa (Maiden from the Village) 1949
Tjitra (Image) 1949
Harta Karun (Treasure) 1949

See also
Cinema of Indonesia
Air Mata Mengalir di Tjitarum

References

Dutch East Indies
Film production companies of the Dutch East Indies